The 2022 season was Clube de Regatas do Flamengo's 127th year of existence, their 111th football season, and their 52nd in the Campeonato Brasileiro Série A, having never been relegated from the top division. In addition to the 2022 Campeonato Brasileiro Série A, Flamengo also competed in the Supercopa do Brasil, CONMEBOL Copa Libertadores, the Copa do Brasil, and the Campeonato Carioca, the top tier of Rio de Janeiro's state football.

The season debut took place against Portuguesa-RJ, in the 1st round of the Taça Guanabara — main phase of the Campeonato Carioca — on January 26, but with younger players. The debut of the main team took place on February 2, in the 3rd round of the Taça Guanabara, against Boavista-RJ. They were runners-up of the Taça Guanabara. In the Carioca finals, they ended up runners-up after a 2–0 defeat and a 1–1 draw against Fluminense.

In the Supercopa do Brasil, they tied in normal time by 2–2 and lost the title in the penalty shoot-out to Atlético Mineiro by 8–7, being, therefore, runner-up.

Kits
On 18 February 2022 Flamengo unveiled its new home kit for the 2022 season with the debut date set to be on 20 February 2022 in the Supercopa do Brasil against Atlético Mineiro.

On 26 April 2022 Flamengo unveiled the goalkeeper's kit for the 2022 season, three days later on 29 April 2022 the club revealed the away kit, although images were leaked weeks before. The club debuted both uniforms two days later in a Copa do Brasil match against Altos.

On 12 August 2022 Flamengo unveiled its third kit. The club debuted this kit on 14 August 2022 against Athletico Paranaense at Maracanã, Flamengo won 5–0.

Supplier: Adidas 
Sponsors: Banco BRB (Main sponsor) / Mercado Livre (Back of the shirt) / Assist Card (Lower back)  / Pixbet (Shoulder) / Havan (Sleeves)  / TIM (Numbers) / ABC da Construção (Shorts) / Luvix (Socks)

Competitions

Overview

Supercopa do Brasil

Flamengo qualified for the 2022 Supercopa do Brasil as runner-up in the 2021 Campeonato Brasileiro, due to Atlético Mineiro titles in the 2021 Campeonato Brasileiro and in the 2021 Copa do Brasil.

Goals and red cards are shown.

Campeonato Carioca

Taça Guanabara

Goals and red cards are shown.

Semi-finals

Finals

Copa Libertadores

Group stage

Goals, assists and red cards are shown.

Round of 16

The draw for the round of 16 was held on 27 May 2022. 

Goals, assists and red cards are shown.

Quarter-finals
Goals, assists and red cards are shown.

Semi-finals
Goals, assists and red cards are shown.

Final

Goals, assists and red cards are shown.

Campeonato Brasileiro

League table

Results by round

Matches
Goals, assists and red cards are shown.

Copa do Brasil

As Flamengo will participate in the 2022 Copa Libertadores, the club entered the Copa do Brasil in the third round.

Third round

Goals, assists and red cards are shown.

Round of 16
Goals, assists and red cards are shown.

Quarter-finals
Goals, assists and red cards are shown.

Semi-finals
Goals, assists and red cards are shown.

Finals

Goals, assists and red cards are shown.

Management team

Roster

New contracts

Transfers and loans

Transfers in

Loan in

Transfers out

Loan out

Statistics

Appearances
Players in italics have left the club before the end of the season.

Goalscorers

Assists

Clean sheets

Season records

Individual
 Most matches played in the season in all competitions: 64 – João Gomes
 Most League matches played in the season: 31 – Ayrton Lucas
 Most matches played as starter in the season in all competitions: 56 – Gabriel Barbosa
 Most League matches played as starter in the season: 27 – Ayrton Lucas
 Most matches played as substitute in the season in all competitions: 26 – Lázaro, Pedro
 Most League matches played as substitute in the season: 12 – Pedro
 Most goals in the season in all competitions: 29 – Pedro, Gabriel Barbosa
 Most League goals in the season: 11 – Gabriel Barbosa, Pedro
 Most clean sheets in the season in all competitions: 18 – Santos
 Most League clean sheets in the season: 8 –  Santos
 Most goals scored in a match: 4
 Pedro vs Deportes Tolima, Copa Libertadores, 6 July 2022
 Goals in consecutive matches in all competitions: 3 consecutive match(es)
 Pedro, 17 May 2022 to 24 May 2022
 Gabriel Barbosa, 18 September 2022 to 1 October 2022
 Goals in consecutive League matches: 3 consecutive match(es)
 Lázaro, 30 July 2022 to 14 August 2022
 Gabriel Barbosa, 18 September 2022 to 1 October 2022
 Fastest goal: 54 seconds
 Matheuzinho vs Juventude, Série A, 9 November 2022
 Hat-tricks:
 Pedro (4 goals) vs Deportes Tolima, Copa Libertadores, 6 July 2022
 Pedro vs Velez Sarsfield, Copa Libertadores, 31 August 2022
 Pedro vs Red Bull Bragantino, Série A, 1 October 2022

Team
 Biggest home win in all competitions:
 7–1 vs Deportes Tolima, Copa Libertadores, 6 July 2022
 Biggest League home win:
 5–0 vs Athletico Paranaense, Série A, 14 August 2022 
 Biggest away win in all competitions:
 6–0 vs Bangu, Campeonato Carioca, 12 March 2022
 Biggest League away win:
 2–0 vs São Paulo, Série A, 6 August 2022
 Biggest home loss in all competitions:
 0–1 vs Fluminense, Campeonato Carioca, 6 February 2022
 0–1 vs Fluminense, Campeonato Carioca, 30 March 2022
 0–1 vs Botafogo, Série A, 8 May 2022
 1–2 vs Fortaleza, Série A, 5 June 2022
 1–2 vs Fluminense, Série A, 18 September 2022
 1–2 vs Corinthians, Série A, 2 November 2022
 1–2 vs Avaí, Série A, 12 November 2022
 Biggest League home loss:
 0–1 vs Botafogo, Série A, 8 May 2022
 1–2 vs Fortaleza, Série A, 5 June 2022
 1–2 vs Fluminense, Série A, 18 September 2022
 1–2 vs Corinthians, Série A, 2 November 2022
 1–2 vs Avaí, Série A, 12 November 2022
 Biggest away loss in all competitions:
 1–3 vs Internacional, Série A, 11 June 2022
 0–2 vs Atlético Mineiro, Série A, 19 June 2022
 Biggest League away loss:
 1–3 vs Internacional, Série A, 11 June 2022
 0–2 vs Atlético Mineiro, Série A, 19 June 2022
 Highest scoring match in all competitions:
 7–1 vs Deportes Tolima, Copa Libertadores, 6 July 2022
 Highest scoring League match:
 4–1 vs Atlético Goianiense, Série A, 30 July 2022
 5–0 vs Athletico Paranaense, Série A, 14 August 2022
 4–1 vs Red Bull Bragantino, Série A, 1 October 2022
 3–2 vs Santos, Série A, 25 October 2022
 Longest winning run in all competitions: 5 consecutive match(es)
 30 July 2022 to 17 August 2022
 Longest League winning run: 6 consecutive match(es)
 16 July 2022 to 14 August 2022
 Longest unbeaten run in all competitions: 19 consecutive match(es)
 13 July 2022 to 14 September 2022
 Longest League unbeaten run: 10 consecutive match(es)
 16 July 2022 to 11 September 2022
 Longest losing run in all competitions: 3 consecutive match(es)
 5 June 2022 to 11 June 2022
 Longest League losing run: 3 consecutive match(es)
 5 June 2022 to 11 June 2022
 Longest without win run in all competitions: 4 consecutive match(es)
 30 July 2022 to 9 August 2022; 2 November 2022 to 12 November 2022
 Longest without League win run: 4 consecutive match(es)
 20 April 2022 to 14 May 2022; 4 September 2022 to 28 September 2022; 2 November 2022 to 12 November 2022 
 Longest scoring run in all competitions: 16 consecutive match(es)
 30 July 2022 to 1 October 2022
 Longest League scoring run: 13 consecutive match(es)
 16 July 2022 to 1 October 2022
 Longest without scoring run in all competitions: 2 consecutive match(es)
 20 April 2022 to 23 April 2022
 Longest League without scoring run: 3 consecutive match(es)
 20 April 2022 to 8 May 2022
 Longest conceding goals run in all competitions: 6 consecutive match(es)
 28 April 2022 to 14 May 2022; 2 November 2022 to 12 November 2022 
 Longest League conceding goals run: 6 consecutive match(es)
 2 November 2022 to 12 November 2022 
 Longest without conceding goals run in all competitions: 5 consecutive match(es)
 2 August 2022 to 17 August 2022
 Longest League without conceding goals run: 2 consecutive match(es)
 16 July 2022 to 20 July 2022; 6 August 2022 to 14 August 2022

National Team statistics

Appearances and goals while playing for Flamengo.

Attendance
Includes all competition home matches in the 2022 season. Attendances recorded represent actual gate attendance, not paid attendance.

a Flamengo x Nova Iguaçu match attendance is not available.

Individual awards

Notes

References

External links
 Clube de Regatas do Flamengo
 Flamengo official website (in Portuguese)

Brazilian football clubs 2022 season
CR Flamengo seasons